Acraea buettneri, the Buettner's acraea, is a butterfly in the family Nymphalidae. It is found in the Democratic Republic of the Congo, Angola and Zambia (the north-western part of the country and the Copperbelt).

Description

A. buettneri Rog. (54 f). Wings above orange-yellow with large angular black dots, which are arranged as in petraea ; distal margin and apex of the forewing narrowly black and the veins before the distal margin black-edged; wings beneath more reddish yellow and the hindwing often with red spots at the base; marginal band narrow, 1 to 1.5 mm. in breadth, above unspotted, beneath with large, transversely placed white marginal spots; the discal dot in 3 large and nearer to the distal margin than those in 2 and 4. Damaraland, Rhodesia and southern Congo.

Biology
The habitat consists of woodland.

Taxonomy
It is a member of the Acraea cepheus species group. See also Pierre & Bernaud, 2014.

References

External links

Images representing Acraea buettneri at Bold

Butterflies described in 1890
buettneri
Butterflies of Africa